First Lieutenant Adolf Opálka (4 January 1915 – 18 June 1942) was a Czechoslovak soldier, member of the Czech sabotage group Out Distance, a World War II anti-Nazi resistance group, and a participant in Operation Anthropoid, the successful mission to kill Reinhard Heydrich.

Opálka was born into a middle-class family in Rešice and joined the Czechoslovak Army in 1936 where he served in the 43rd Infantry Regiment in Brno. The Munich Agreement and subsequent German occupation of Czechoslovakia led to the disbanding of the Czechoslovak Army, and Opálka's career ended. He escaped to North Africa where he served in the French Foreign Legion, and he later returned to France. He then joined the Out Distance group and participated in Operation Anthropoid. He was found days later by the Nazis, and he committed suicide in the Church of Saints Cyril and Methodius in Prague after a gunfight in which he was injured.

Early life
Opálka was born in Rešice near Dukovany the illegitimate son of miller Viktor Jarolím (1889–1942) of Tulešice and Anežka Opálková. When his mother died in 1923, Opálka lived with his aunt Marie Opálková (1882–1942).

Between 1932 and 1936, Opálka studied at the Commercial Academy and, shortly after his graduation in 1936, he joined the army of Czechoslovakia. After recruitment and training, he was assigned to the 43rd Infantry Regiment in Brno and shortly afterwards attended the Army Academy in Hranice. After graduation, Opálka joined the 2nd Mountain Regiment in Ružomberok as a lieutenant.

The Munich Agreement ended Opálka's army career in his homeland, and he left Czechoslovakia with his cousin František Pospíšil. First travelling through Poland and France, they fled to North Africa, where they joined the French Foreign Legion. Opálka served in Sidi Bel Abbes as a sergeant of the 1st Infantry Regiment. Later, he joined Senegal's Gunmen in Oran.

Opálka's fiancée spoke about this period of his life:

World War II
After the start of World War II and the occupation of Czechoslovakia, Opálka returned to France from Africa and joined a developing Czechoslovak army in Agde, serving as leader of an infantry platoon of the 2nd Infantry Regiment of the 1st Czechoslovak Infantry Division. In January 1940, he was transferred to the 3rd Infantry Division and commanded the 5th Infantry Battalion.

On 12 July 1940, when France was defeated, Opálka sailed on the troopship  to the United Kingdom and as an unfiled officer served in a machine gun platoon. In the summer of 1941, he volunteered as a soldier for covert operations behind enemy lines. He had been trained in Scotland in Special Training Schools. Afterwards, he became leader of the group codenamed "Out Distance".

Out Distance

Opálka (cover name "Adolf Král"), Ivan Kolařík ("Jan Krátký"), and Karel Čurda ("Karel Vrbas") secretly parachuted into the Protectorate of Bohemia and Moravia on 28 March 1942 to perform covert operations including bomber navigation and sabotage. The operations of Out Distance were complicated from the beginning. A navigational mistake by the Handley Page Halifax plane bringing them in caused the entire group to be dropped at the wrong location. This, together with the loss of equipment, led to the splitting up of the group. Opálka contacted captain Alfréd Bartoš from the group Silver-A and informed him of the situation. He later joined the group gathered around Operation Anthropoid in Prague and became leader of the Prague parachuters.

Operation Anthropoid

Operation Anthropoid involved a plot to kill Reinhard Heydrich, the Reichsprotektor of wartime Bohemia and Moravia with a modified anti-tank grenade. After the mission was carried out, Opálka and his six fellow combatants (Josef Bublík, Jozef Gabčík, Jan Hrubý, Jan Kubiš, Josef Valčík, and Jaroslav Švarc) were tracked to the Church of St. Cyril and St. Methodious in Prague. At 16:15 on 18 June 1942, the church was besieged by 800 soldiers of the German army and Waffen-SS. After a seven-hour fight, the outnumbered group of paratroopers fell. All died, including First Lieutenant Adolf Opálka who, injured by shrapnel, committed suicide.

Shortly after his departure, on his 27th birthday, Opálka wrote of homesickness:

After the mission of the paratroopers, the Nazis unleashed strong reprisals. Opálka's aunt, Marie Opálková, was executed in Mauthausen on 24 October 1942. His father, Viktor Jarolím, was also killed.

Honors and decorations
 Czechoslovak War Cross, 1939, 1942, and 1945
 King's Commendation, posthumously, 1947
 Gold Medal of the Czechoslovak Military Order for Liberty, 1949
 First Class Star of Czechoslovak Army Order of the White Lion for Victory, posthumously, 1968
 Order of Milan Rastislav Štefánik, Third Class, posthumously, 1991
 Promoted to colonel, posthumously, 2002

See also
 Jan Kubiš
 Jozef Gabčík
 Josef Valčík
 Operation Anthropoid

References

Further reading
 David Stafford, "Britain and European Resistance, 1940–1945", University of Toronto Press 1980, .
 Lewis M. White, "On All Fronts: Czechoslovaks in World War II", .
 David Chackom "Like a Man", .
 J.B. Hutak, "With Blood and with Iron: The Lidice Story"

External links
 Remembrance of Operation Anthropoid members 
 Encyclopedia of Brno 
 Opalka's personal file 

1915 births
1942 deaths
People from Znojmo District
Czech resistance members
Czechoslovak military personnel killed in World War II
Czechoslovak soldiers
Grand Crosses of the Order of the White Lion
Operation Anthropoid
Resistance members killed by Nazi Germany
Recipients of the Queen's Commendation for Brave Conduct
Recipients of the Czechoslovak War Cross
Recipients of the Milan Rastislav Stefanik Order
Soldiers of the French Foreign Legion
Forced suicides